Tooniverse (portmanteau short for Cartoon Universe) is a cartoon and anime channel broadcast by CJ ENM E&M Division (formerly On-Media), in South Korea.

Tooniverse commenced airing in December 1995 and is currently one of the leading animation channels in South Korea. It offers a wide variety of animations for different age groups from children to adults.

History
Tooniverse officially launched on December 1, 1995, and was recognized as a channel more unfamiliar than terrestrial broadcasting in the early days, but many of the imported animations were Japanese-coloured, requiring attention from parents. As of 2009, the channel is operated under CJ ENM, which has steadily preoccupied the 5th place in the cable TV viewing market share as the viewership rate has gradually increased since 2000. A month ago, the English education video Dooly's Backpacking was released.

On March 1, 2002, it started broadcasting on SkyLife channel 656, a digital satellite broadcasting service that has been officially commercialized, and became the most popular viewership rating in the skylife by overtaking other channels. However, in November of that year, On-Media (now CJ ENM) unilaterally refused to renew the contract, and was exclusively broadcast through cable TV from January 1, 2003, to August 31, 2011.

In the meantime, as ad revenues in the pay-TV market fell sharply due to worsening management, the Internet Multimedia Broadcasting Business Act for IPTV commercialization passed the National Assembly in an environment of broadcasting and communication convergence, as part of the increase in revenues from subscription fees and diversification of the broadcasting market. In 2008, the second half of IPTV, the leading provider KT to start, and in 2009, latecomers, which was SK Broadband and LG U+ communications by three after consultation with IPTV operators, and initiate transmission. In 2011 CJ Group after the acquisition, the animation in the channel for children was to change the broadcast genre channels, the same year on September 1 from contingent upon the ongoing needs of satellite subscribers, the digital satellite broadcasting service, SkyLife (Hereinafter referred to as KT OTS), transmission to HDTV channels was resumed in 9 years. On August 15, 2012, the logo and slogan were changed to the current one, and HDTV broadcasting was officially launched on January 11, 2013, one year and four months after the establishment of the HDTV channel.

Currently, it can be watched through all cable TVs in Korea, KT's Olleh TV Live, SK Broadband's BTV, and other communication companies' IPTV and digital satellite broadcasting (KT SkyLife).

Preschool programs that aired on the morning of March 2011 was replaced by LittleTooni.

In 2012, Tooniverse created their first teen television series, Ma Boy. The Starleague professional StarCraft: Brood War broadcasts began as a program on Tooniverse before being spin-off onto a dedicated gaming channel, Ongamenet.

In April 2013, Marvel TV Animation series program exclusive contract. On July 26, 2013, KidZania Seoul opened a "studio actors" where children could experience being a voice actor.

In 2014, the Tooniverse store opened in Lotte World. Meanwhile, it was announced that Tooniverse would air a pilot episode titled . In 2016, Tooniverse created the first season of The Haunted House: The Secret of the Ghost Ball. The following year, it was announced that there would be a season 2 to the series.

On April 2, 2018, Tooniverse's website has opened, and was shut down Tunisia Games website.

In 2018, Tooniverse plans that The Haunted House going to be in film, video game and other media series. And produced another drama series called Remember, Hari, which was a live action drama based on the animated series.

In the same year, the show returned with a season 2 that was named The Haunted House: The Birth of Ghost Ball X.

In 2020, Tooniverse announced that would be a season 3 to the series that was called The Haunted House: Ghost Ball Double X Part 1 and Part 2.

In 2021, the new season premiere in September, 2021 called The Haunted House: Ghost Ball Z.

After finished the Part 1, Tooniverse announced have right to streaming on TVING in special episode released on December 22, 2021, called The Haunted House Special Edition: The Vampire of Light and the Child of Darkness, and also aired this channel. And then later release April 28, 2022 titled Guido Exorcist in Part 2.

Following the partnership between CJ ENM and Paramount along with launching Paramount+ into TVING streaming platform, Tooniverse is bringing Nickelodeon cartoons to the channel under the Nickelodeon Time programming block.

In August 2022, Tooniverse announced that the show is going to be aired on Jujutsu Kaisen on September 23, 2022, as well aired on Erased, That Time I Got Reincarnated as a Slime, Sword Art Online and other anime to the channel under the TooniTeen programming block at every Friday & Saturday night from 10 p.m. KST.

After officially released in December 14, 2022 on The Haunted House: The Dimensional Goblin and the Seven Worlds, the next season will be released in March 2023 called The Haunted House: Ghost Ball ZERO.

Logo

Currently programming
Note: The following programs is censoring in anime or cartoon on Tooniverse.

For Ages 7+
 Dalja the Vampire Girl (Tooniverse original)
 Robot Trains
 Baby Shark's Big Show!
 Pokémon
 Hello Jadoo (Tooniverse original)
 SpongeBob SquarePants
 The Fairly OddParents
 Ninjago: Masters of Spinjitzu
 Turning Mecard
 Bakugan: Battle Planet

For Ages 12+
 The Haunted House (Tooniverse original)
 The Haunted House: The Secret of the Ghost Ball (Season 1)
 The Haunted House: The Birth of the Ghost Ball X (Season 2)
 The Haunted House: Ghost Ball Double X (Season 3)
 The Haunted House: Ghost Ball Z (Season 4)
 Papadog (Tooniverse original)
 Gobllin Hill (Tooniverse original)
 Teenage Mutant Ninja Turtles
 Case Closed (formerly on older episodes)

For Ages 15+
Case Closed (Currently)
 Jujutsu Kaisen
 My Master Has No Tail
 Kodomo Keisatsu
 That Time I Got Reincarnated as a Slime
 Sword Art Online
 Fruits Basket
 Erased

Formerly programming

Note: The following programs is censoring in anime or cartoon on Tooniverse.

For All Ages
 Rainbow Ruby 
 Dora the Explorer 
 Willa's Wild Life 
 Little Einsteins 
 Tinpo 
 Hello Kitty 
 Wow! Wow! Wubbzy! 
 Remy & Boo 
 Hamtaro 
 Babar and the Adventures of Badou 
 Princess Mirror-Belle

For Ages 7+
 Ultimate Spider-Man
 Eliot Kid
 Bakugan Battle Brawlers
 The Powerpuff Girls
 Monster High
 Crayon Shin-chan
 Reborn!
 Shaman King
 The Fungies!
 Beyblade Burst
 The Pink Panther
 Viewtiful Joe
 UFO Baby
 Dinosaur King
 My Little Pony: Friendship is Magic 
 My Little Pony: Pony Life
 Wedding Peach
 Element Hunters
 Thomas and Friends
 The Smurfs
 Yo-Kai Watch (dubbed version) (cut version)
 Danny Phantom
 Hero School Z (Tooniverse original)
 Johnny Test
 Dexter's Laboratory
 Ojamajo Doremi
 Rock Lee & His Ninja Pals
 Oggy and the Cockroaches
 Avatar: The Last Airbender
 Sailor Moon Crystal (subtitled version)
 Cardcaptor Sakura: Clear Card
 Sid the Science Kid 
 Pippi Longstocking
 Digimon Adventure
 Digimon Adventure 02
 Digimon Tamers
 Digimon Frontier
 Power Rangers Lightspeed Rescue
 Kirby: Right Back at Ya!
 Full Moon o Sagashite
 Zatch Bell! (Episodes 1~52 Only)
 Oswaldo
 Squish
 PriPri Chi-chan!!
 Hikaru no Go
 GeGeGe no Kitarō
 Kaiketsu Zorori
 Animal Yokochō
 Animaniacs 
 Anyamaru Tantei Kiruminzuu
 Shima Shima Tora no Shimajirō
 Giant Saver
 Totally Spies!
 Magic Hanja
 Me and My Robot
 Welcome to Convenience Store
 Seer
 Taoist Mutul
 Maya the Bee
 Buri the Time Traveler
 Bananana Doongdoong
 Larva
 Lego Friends
 Little Charmers
 Mainichi Kaasan
 Picchipichi Shizuku-chan
 Kids CSI
 Aikatsu!
 Boing The Play Ranger
 Cocomong
 Kobushi
 Topplate
 Kaleido Star 
 T-Pang Rescue
 Tiny Toons Adventures 
 Legends of Chima
 Lucky Fred
 Tobot
 Soreike! Anpanman
 Nintama Rantarō
 Yumeiro Patissiere
 A Penguin's Troubles
 Mirmo!
 Shizuku-chan
 Tickety Toc
 Pretty Rhythm: Dear My Future
 Pretty Rhythm: Rainbow Live
 Pretty Rhythm: Aurora Dream
 Atashin'chi
 Babar
 Pucca: Love Recipe
 Rolling Stars
 Cleopatra in Space
 Powerbirds
 Monster Buster Club
 The Twisted Whiskers Show
 Sugar Sugar Rune
 Dooly the Little Dinosaur
 Robocar Poli
 Pororo the Little Penguin
 Miraculous: Tales of Ladybug and Cat Noir
 Shugo Chara!
 Twin Princess of Wonder Planet
 Supa Strikas
 Tanken Driland
 Chi's Sweet Home
 Miffy's Adventures Big and Small

For Ages 12+
 Kuromajo-san ga Toru!!
 Oh No! It's an Alien Invasion
 Bakuryū Sentai Abaranger
 Tokusou Sentai Dekaranger
 One Piece (2004–2013) (dubbed version) (cut version)
 Tsubasa: Reservoir Chronicle
 Naruto (2005-2008) (All Episodes) (dubbed version) (cut version)
 Dragon Ball (dubbed version)
 Dragon Ball Z (dubbed version)
 Dragon Ball GT (dubbed version)
 Chibi Devi!
 Love, Chunibyo & Other Delusions
 Baka and Test 
 Age 12
 Fushigi Dagashiya Zenitendō
 Mobile Suit Gundam SEED
 Midori Days
 Yakitate!! Japan
 Bobobo-bo Bo-bobo
 The Prince of Tennis
 Detective School Q
 Okojo-san
 Kekkaishi
 Chōsoku Henkei Gyrozetter
 Yo-kai Watch Shadowside (dubbed version) (cut version)
 The Magic of Chocolate
 ThunderCats Roar

For Ages 15+
 Remember, Hari (Tooniverse original on The Haunted House series)
 Remember, Hari 2 (Season 2)
 The Dating Formula Hari Koo (Tooniverse original on The Haunted House series)
 Ma Boy (Tooniverse original)
 To Heart
 Arata: The Legend
 Mamotte! Lollipop
 The Simpsons
 Bleach (2007-2008) (dubbed version) (cut version) (Episodes 1~53 Only)
 Naruto: Shippuden (2008-2018) (All Episodes) (dubbed version) (cut version)
 Boruto: Naruto Next Generations
 The Avengers: Earth's Mightiest Heroes
 Rurouni Kenshin
 Gatchaman Crowds
 Fantasista Doll
 The High Fructose Adventures of Annoying Orange
 Kamen Rider Ryuki
 Kamen Rider 555
 Your Lie in April
 Inuyasha
 Meganebu!
 Galilei Donna
 Sket Dance

For Ages 19+ (1995~2011 Only)
 Cowboy Bebop
 Pet Shop of Horrors
 You're Under Arrest
 Record of Lodoss War
 Boogiepop Phantom
 Nudlnude (uncut)
 Phantom Quest Corp.
 Dirty Pair Flash
 Battle Angel Alita
 Gokusen
 Air Master
 Dokkoida!?
 Ghost Stories
 Peach Girl
 Bubblegum Crisis Tokyo 2040
 Angel Heart
 Platinumhugen Ordian
 Super Radical Gag Family (
 Future GPX Cyber Formula (
 Weiß Kreuz
 Daria
 Hellsing
 Monster
 Great Teacher Onizuka
 My Bride is a Mermaid
 Family Guy (subtitled version)
 Samurai Champloo
 Haré+Guu
 South Park (subtitled version) (This series was banned in 2001 due to explicit content, was aired in 2000)
 Gintama
 Trinity Blood
 Eden of the East

Toonichoice

Toonichoice Winner
In 2004
Inuyasha

In 2005
Naruto

In 2006
Sgt. Frog

In 2007
Ouran High School Host Club

In 2008
Reborn!

In 2009
Case Closed

In 2010
Case Closed

In 2011
Case Closed

See also
Nickelodeon
Cartoon Network
Disney Channel
 aeni

References

External links
  
 
 
 
 
 Official The Haunted House website 
 Official Tooniverse The Haunted House: The Secret of the Ghost Ball website 
 Official Tooniverse The Haunted House: The Birth of Ghost Ball X Part 1 website 
 Official Tooniverse The Haunted House: The Birth of Ghost Ball X Part 2 website 
 Official Tooniverse The Haunted House: Ghost Ball Double X 6 Prophecies website 
 Official Tooniverse The Haunted House: Ghost Ball Double X Suspicious Request website 
 Official Tooniverse The Haunted House: Ghost Ball Z website 
 Official Tooniverse The Haunted House: Ghost Ball Z: Guido Exorcist website 
 Official Tooniverse The Haunted House: Ghost Ball ZERO website 

CJ E&M channels
On-Media television networks
Children's television networks
Television networks in South Korea
Korean-language television stations
Television channels in South Korea
Children's television channels in South Korea
Television channels and stations established in 1995
Anime television
1995 establishments in South Korea
Anime and Cartoon television